The third season of Popstar, premiered on Rede Globo on Sunday, October 27, 2019 at 1:00 p.m. / 12:00 p.m. (BRT / AMT).

Contestants

Elimination chart
Key
 – Contestant did not perform
 – Contestant was in the bottom two and relegated to elimination zone
 – Contestant received the lowest combined score and was eliminated
 – Contestant received the highest combined score
 – Contestant received the highest combined score and won immunity
 – Contestant finished as runner-up
 – Contestant finished as the winner

Week 1
Specialists

 Artur Xexéo
 Dinho Ouro Preto
 Manu Gavassi
 Marcelo Soares
 Maria Rita
 Preta Gil
 Pretinho da Serrinha
 Rosanah Fienngo
 Tony Tornado
 Vanessa da Mata

Week 2
Specialists

 Diogo Nogueira
 Elza Soares
 Gustavo Mioto
 João Augusto
 Luiza Possi
 Mariana Aydar
 Paulo Ricardo
 Projota
 Toni Garrido
 Sandra de Sá

Week 3
Specialists

 Dennis Carvalho
 Elymar Santos
 Gaby Amarantos
 Hamilton de Holanda
 Karol Conka
 Lexa
 Mari Moon
 Monarco
 Paulo Miklos
 Rael

Week 4
Specialists

 Buchecha
 Chico Barney
 Daniel
 Emanuelle Araújo
 Péricles
 Roberto Menescal
 Rosemary
 Samuel Rosa
 Xênia França
 Zizi Possi

Week 5
Specialists

 Ana Carolina
 Bellutti
 Junior Lima
 Marcos
 Maria Rita
 Paulo Lima
 Roberta Sá
 Tony Tornado
 Vitor Kley
 Wanderléa

Week 6
Specialists

 Byafra
 Dudu Nobre
 Ed Motta
 Fafá de Belém
 Fernanda Abreu
 Gabriel Moura
 Joelma Mendes
 Luiza Possi
 Paula Mattos
 Tony Goes

Week 7
Specialists

 Branco Mello
 Eduardo Dussek
 Karol Conka
 Lucy Alves
 Martinho da Vila
 Paulo Ricardo
 Roberta Miranda
 Sarah Oliveira
 Sergio Affonso
 Sidney Magal

Week 8
Specialists

 Ana Carolina
 Daniela Mercury
 Di Ferrero
 Didi Wagner 
 Elba Ramalho
 George Israel
 Hamilton de Holanda
 Ivan Lins
 Manu Gavassi
 Paulo Junqueiro

Week 9: Semifinals
Specialists

 Amelinha
 Bernardo Araújo
 Ed Motta
 Emanuelle Araújo
 Luciana Mello
 Monarco
 Paula Fernandes
 Paulinho Moska
 Tato
 Vitor Kley

Week 10: Finals
Specialists

 Alinne Rosa
 Artur Xexéo
 Dudu Nobre
 Emilio Dantas
 Fafá de Belém
 Marcelo Soares
 Maria Rita
 Preta Gil
 Projota
 Tony Tornado

Ratings and reception

Brazilian ratings
All numbers are in points and provided by Kantar Ibope Media.

References

External links
 PopStar on Gshow.com

2019 Brazilian television seasons